Sayyad Expressway is an expressway in Tehran. It starts from Babayi Expressway and ends in Sabalan Street.

It is named after the assassinated Ali Sayad Shirazi, chief-of-staff of the Iranian Armed Forces during the eight-year Iran–Iraq war.

Expressways in Tehran